All I Want Is You... and You... and You... is a 1974 British comedy film directed by Bob Kellett and starring Freddie Earlle, David Griffin and Carol Cleveland. Its plot is about an American business tycoon who tries to choose a new vice president for his firm in a weekend gathering that soon descends into farce.

Cast
 Freddie Earlle - Doctor Brack
 David Griffin - Freddie Millbank
 Ian Trigger - Joe Hartford
 Sheila Steafel - Wilma Brack
 Marie Rogers - Polly Pearce
 Hilary Pritchard - Freda Donohue
 Carol Cleveland - Eli Hartford
 Barry Linehan - Bull Donohue
 Noel Trevarthen - Frank Pearce
 Timothy Blackstone - Boy
 Berrick Kyler - Boy
 Julia McCarthy - Wife
 Ronnie Stevens - Husband
 Koo Stark - Jennifer Ready
 Derek Griffiths - Taxi Driver
 Louise Stark - Helga

References

External links

1972 films
1972 comedy films
1970s English-language films
British comedy films
Films directed by Bob Kellett
1970s British films